Jesse Gilbert Campbell Jr. (born April 11, 1969) is a former American football safety in the National Football League (NFL) for the Washington Redskins, Philadelphia Eagles, and the New York Giants. He played college football at North Carolina State University and was drafted by the Eagles in the second round of the 1991 NFL Draft. He was a high school football coach for Gulfport High School in Gulfport, Mississippi. He is now an assistant principal at New Bern High School in  New Bern, North Carolina, just south of his home town.

References

1969 births
Living people
American football safeties
NC State Wolfpack football players
New York Giants players
Philadelphia Eagles players
Washington Redskins players
High school football coaches in Mississippi
People from Washington, North Carolina
Sportspeople from New Bern, North Carolina
Players of American football from North Carolina
African-American coaches of American football
African-American players of American football